James William Fleming (5 December 1901 – May 1969) was a Scottish footballer who played for St Johnstone, Rangers and Ayr United as a centre forward.

Career
Fleming made his Rangers debut against Dundee in October 1925 and scored in a 2–1 defeat at Ibrox. His last appearance was in October 1934 against Queen of the South. In one memorable match he got possession of the ball in defence and worked his way down the pitch, avoiding all tackles, to score a spectacular goal.

He holds the record for the most Scottish Cup goals scored by a Rangers player, with 44, as well as the record of having scored the most goals in a single match for Rangers, scoring nine times in a 14–2 Scottish Cup win against Blairgowrie in 1934.

He represented Scotland three times between 1929 and 1930, scoring three goals. Two of these goals were scored in a 5–2 defeat by England at Wembley.

See also
List of footballers in Scotland by number of league goals (200+)

References 

Sources

1901 births
1969 deaths
Rangers F.C. players
Scotland international footballers
Scottish Football League players
Scottish footballers
Association football forwards
Scottish Football League representative players
Scottish Junior Football Association players
People from Dennistoun
Footballers from Glasgow
Glasgow United F.C. players
St Johnstone F.C. players
Ayr United F.C. players